Epihippus is an extinct genus of the modern horse family Equidae that lived in the Eocene, from 46 to 38 million years ago. 

 
Epihippus is believed to have evolved from Orohippus, which continued the evolutionary trend of increasingly efficient grinding teeth. Epihippus had five grinding, low-crowned cheek teeth with well-formed crests. A late species of Epihippus, sometimes referred to as Duchesnehippus intermedius, had teeth similar to Oligocene equids, although slightly less developed. Epihippus fed on mostly insects, berries, and plant material as a browser and insectivore. Whether Duchesnehippus was a subgenus of Epihippus or a distinct genus is disputed. This is an early species of a horse.

There are three species:
 Epihippus gracilis
 Epihippus intermedius
 Epihippus uintensis

References

Eocene horses
Eocene odd-toed ungulates
Eocene mammals of North America
Paleogene United States
Prehistoric placental genera
Extinct mammals of North America
Eocene genus extinctions
Eocene extinctions
Fossil taxa described in 1877